Matthias Jouan (born February 4, 1984 in Caen) is a French professional football player. Currently, he plays for US Granville.

He played at the professional level in Ligue 1 for SM Caen.

References

1984 births
Living people
French footballers
Ligue 1 players
Stade Malherbe Caen players
FC Rouen players
US Quevilly-Rouen Métropole players
USJA Carquefou players
Jura Sud Foot players
Championnat National players
Footballers from Caen
Association football midfielders